Troll is a natural gas and oil field in the Norwegian sector of the North Sea, one of the biggest in the North Sea, holding 40% of Norway’s gas – it also possesses significant quantities of oil, in thin zones under the gas cap, to the west of the field. Most of the gas lies in Troll East.

Operators
The field is operated by Equinor, which has a 30.58% interest. The other partners are Petoro (56%), Shell plc (8.1%), ConocoPhillips (1.62%) and TotalEnergies (3.69%).

Platforms

Gas and oil from the field is extracted via three platforms – Troll A, B and C.

The Troll A platform, based on the Condeep technology, is the tallest structure ever to be moved. This platform came into production in 1996 after being towed out from Rogaland in May 1995 

The Troll B Platform is a semi-submersible designed by Doris and fabricated from concrete; thought to be the only concrete semisubmersible. This platform came into production in 1995.

The Troll C Platform is a conventional steel hull semi-submersible designed by GVA Consultants. This platform came into production in 1999.

Area
Extending across four North Sea blocks, the whole field covers just over 700 square kilometres, corresponding to about 100 000 football pitches.

Geology
The reservoir is located in three eastward-tilted fault blocks 1500 m subsea and consists of cyclic shallow-marine sandstones from the Fensfjord, middle Heather, Sognefjord and upper Heather formations in the Jurassic Viking Group, and are overlain by Upper Jurassic to Paleocene clays. Located in the eastern margin of the Viking Graben, water depths range from 300–355 m.

References

External links 

Troll in the Interactive Energy Map of Aftenbladet
Articles on Troll at Equinor 50 years history page

Oil fields in Norway
Natural gas fields in Norway
North Sea energy
Equinor oil and gas fields
Shell plc oil and gas fields
ConocoPhillips oil and gas fields
TotalEnergies